Khurshid or Khursheed may refer to:

People:
Salman Khurshid (born 1952/53), Indian politician & diplomat 
Khursheed Bano (1914–2001), Indian actor & singer

Khurshid, Persian-language and South Asian name (of people)